Adam Wool is an American politician serving as a member of the Alaska House of Representatives from District 5. He is a member of the Democratic Party.

Career 
Wool defeated Republican Representative Pete Higgins in 2014, picking up his seat for the Democratic minority.

In 2017, Wool was responsible for pushing legislation through the Alaska House of Representatives that legalized the use of ride-sharing apps such as Uber and Lyft in Alaska.

Personal life
Wool is originally from Boston, Massachusetts. He lives in Fairbanks with his wife Kate and their two daughters. He owns Fairbanks's Blue Loon bar, which he founded.

References

External links 

 Campaign website

21st-century American Jews
21st-century American politicians
Businesspeople from Fairbanks, Alaska
Candidates in the 2022 United States House of Representatives elections
Democratic Party members of the Alaska House of Representatives
Jewish American state legislators in Alaska
Living people
Musicians from Alaska
Politicians from Boston
Politicians from Fairbanks, Alaska
University of Alaska Fairbanks alumni
Year of birth missing (living people)